Lisbeth Holand (born 20 January 1946, in Vikna) is a Norwegian politician for the Socialist Left Party.

She was elected to the Norwegian Parliament from Nordland in 1989, and was re-elected on one occasion. She had previously served as a deputy representative during the terms 1985–1989, and later served in this position from 1997–2001.

Holand was involved in local politics in Brønnøy municipality. She is also a former leader of Nei til EU. In 1968–1970 she was a member of the national board of the Young Liberals of Norway.

Outside politics she graduated as cand.polit. from the University of Oslo in 1975. She worked as a school teacher, since 2000 as a lecturer at Nesna University College.

References

1946 births
Living people
Socialist Left Party (Norway) politicians
Members of the Storting
Nordland politicians
University of Oslo alumni
Academic staff of Nesna University College
Women members of the Storting
Norwegian women academics
20th-century Norwegian politicians
20th-century Norwegian women politicians
People from Vikna